Robertkochia sediminum is a Gram-negative, strictly aerobic and rod-shaped bacterium from the genus of Robertkochia which has been isolated from coastal sediments from the Xiaoshi Island from China.

References

Flavobacteria
Bacteria described in 2022